Mobile application management (MAM) describes the software and services responsible for provisioning and controlling access to internally developed and commercially available mobile apps used in business settings, on both company-provided and 'bring your own' mobile operating systems as used on smartphones and tablet computers.

Mobile application management provides granular controls at the application level which enable system administrators to manage and secure application or 'app' data.  MAM differs from mobile device management (MDM), which focuses on controlling the entire device, and requires that users enroll or register their device, and install a service agent.

While some enterprise mobility management (EMM) suites include a MAM function, their capabilities may be limited in comparison to stand-alone MAM solutions, because EMM suites require a device management profile in order to enable app management capabilities.

History
Enterprise mobile application management has been driven by the widespread adoption and use of mobile applications in business settings.  In 2010, the International Data Corporation (IDC) reported that smartphone use in the workplace will double between 2009 and 2014.

The 'bring your own device' (BYOD) phenomenon is a factor behind mobile application management, with personal PC, smartphone, and tablet use in business settings, vs. business-owned devices, rising from 31 percent in 2010 to 41 percent in 2011.  When an employee brings a personal device into an enterprise setting, mobile application management enables the corporate information technology (IT) staff to download required applications, control access to business data, and remove locally cached business data from the device if it is lost or stolen, or when its owner no longer works with the company.

Use of mobile devices in the workplace is also being driven from above.  According to Forrester Research, businesses now see mobile as an opportunity to drive innovation across a wide range of business processes.  Forrester issued a forecast in August 2011 predicting that the "mobile management services market" would reach $6.6 billion by 2015 – a 69 percent increase over a previous forecast issued six months earlier.

Citing the plethora of mobile devices in the enterprise – and a growing demand for mobile apps from employees, line-of-business decision-makers, and customers – the report states that organizations are broadening their "mobility strategy" beyond mobile device management to "managing a growing number of mobile applications".The advent of Internet of Things (IoT) has been changing lives for the better. It is not limited to homes but, has a pivotal role connecting teams, devices and decisions. With more connected devices, there is a boost in data generation, data analysis and reporting.

App wrapping
App wrapping was initially a favoured method of applying policy to applications as part of mobile application management solutions.

App wrapping sets up a dynamic library, and adds to an existing binary that controls certain aspects of an application.  For instance, at start-up, you can change an app so that it requires authentication using a local passkey.  Or you could intercept a communication so that it would be forced to use your company's virtual private network (VPN), or prevent that communication from reaching a particular application that holds sensitive data.

Normally, application wrapping is performed using a SDK from an application or EMM seller that permits an engineer or administrator to convey an API that empowers the board arrangements to be set up. For instance, an application wrapping API would permit an administrator to control who can download a portable application and whether corporate information got to by that application can be reordered.  Application wrapping can be applied during interior advancement of programming or sometime later to off-the-rack programming buys essentially by adding executable code through the SDK. 

Quite possibly the most broadly utilized portable application stages, Microsoft's Office 365, likewise gives its own extraordinary arrangement of issues respect to the board. Before, Office 365 didn't permit application the executives by means of outsider EMM supports; that usefulness was accessible just through its InTune cloud-based administration. 

Increasingly, the likes of Apple and Samsung are overcoming the issue of app wrapping.  Aside from the fact that app wrapping is a legal grey zone, and may not meet its actual aims, it is not possible to adapt the entire operating system to deal with numerous wrapped apps.  In general, wrapped apps available in the app stores have also not proven to be successful due to their inability to perform without MDM.

System features
An end-to-end mobile application management solution provides the ability to: control the provisioning, updating, and removal of mobile applications via an enterprise app store, monitor application performance and usage, and remotely wipe data from managed applications.  Core features of mobile application management systems include:

App configuration
App delivery (Enterprise App Store)
App performance monitoring
App updating
App version management
App wrapping
Crash log reporting
Event management
Push services
Reporting and tracking
Usage analytics
User & group access control
User authentication

See also

Over-the-air programming
Mobile security
List of Mobile Device Management software

References

Mobile telecommunication services
Application Management
Application Management